The  was an electric multiple unit (EMU) train type operated by Japanese National Railways (JNR) from 1950 until 1983. A total of 652 vehicles were built.

Variants
 80-0 series
 80-100/200 series: Trains introduced from 1956 with increased seat pitch and improvements for use in cold regions
 80-300 series: Trains with all-steel bodies

Interior

Preserved examples
Two first-batch 80 series cars, driving car KuHa 86001 and intermediate car MoHa 80001, are preserved on display at the Kyoto Railway Museum in Kyoto.

References 

Train-related introductions in 1950
Electric multiple units of Japan
1500 V DC multiple units of Japan